The Mullet Peninsula—also known as the Mullet (an Mhuirthead) and sometimes as the Erris Peninsula—is a peninsula in the barony of Erris in County Mayo, Ireland. As of 2016 it has a population of 3963. It consists of a large promontory connected to the mainland at Belmullet (Béal an Mhuirthead), a town of about 1,000 inhabitants, by a narrow isthmus. There are several villages on the Mullet peninsula including Aughleam, Elly, Corclough and Binghamstown. Its northernmost point is Erris Head. The peninsula's doglegged shape forms two bays, Blacksod Bay and Broadhaven Bay.

The Mullet Peninsula is part of the Mayo Gaeltacht, meaning that Irish is a relatively common language. According to the 2016 census about 8% of the population spoke Irish on a daily basis outside the education system. The area has several Irish-language summer schools. The Mullet is a tourist destination, and has several beaches and a mild climate; chief attractions include golf, watersports, kiting, boating, fishing, and sea-angling.

Name
The origin of the names Mullet and an Mhuirthead is not clear. They may have come from Irish Muileat or an Mhuileat, which has been translated as "(the) isthmus". Bernard O'Hara in Mayo: Aspects of its Heritage suggests that "A change from 'L' to 'R', which is quite common in Irish" may have resulted in a change to an Mhuireat, which in turn became an Mhuirthead. It has also been suggested that the name may be from English and refer to the fish or the star shape used in heraldry.

Antiquities and places of interest

Despite its apparent sandy 'barrenness', the Mullet Peninsula has much to offer in way of interesting historical artefacts. The parish of Kilcommon which lies to the northeast of the Mullet has more visible prehistoric monuments such as in-situ megalithic tombs.

Several islands lie off the coast of the Mullet peninsula including the Inishkea Islands, Inishglora and Duvillaun.  There are lighthouses on other small islands off the coast at Blackrock and Eagle Island.

The Saint Deirbhle heritage centre based at Aughleam near the southern end of the peninsula has a collection of books and historical information on the area. The saint's old church and St. Deirbhile's Well, where it is alleged that a cure for eye problems can be acquired, is a couple of miles from the centre.

Glosh tower on Termon Hill is one of the 82 Napoleonic signal towers built 1801-1806 by the English holds a commanding view of the area.

Sculptures may be found on Glosh Beach.

Ocean wave energy test site
In the northwest of the Mullet peninsula a site for testing full-scale ocean wave power devices has been selected between Frenchport Pier, Annagh Head and Cross. This site will be the first time full-scale devices have been tested off the west coast of Ireland.  Prototypes have been tank tested in Cork and scaled models have undergone testing near Spiddal in Galway Bay in recent years.  The wave energy potential in the Atlantic Ocean between North Mayo and West Donegal is one of the best in the world for the development of this new renewable energy technology. Several device types will be tested off the Mullet Peninsula.

Transport
Bus Éireann route 446 links the peninsula with Belmullet, Bangor Erris, Bellacorick, Crossmolina and Ballina. There is one service a day in each direction, including Sundays. On Friday evenings an extra journey operates from Ballina. Onward bus and rail connections are available at Ballina.

See also
 Wild Atlantic Way

References

Peninsulas of County Mayo
Gaeltacht towns and villages
Gaeltacht places in County Mayo
Erris